The black scraper (Thamnaconus modestus) is a species of filefish in the family Monacanthidae. It is found in the temperate waters in the Northwest Pacific Ocean. It is commercially fished in China, and has been successfully aquacultured.

Sources
 
"Thamnaconus modestus" .IUCN Red List of Threatened Species. 2019

References

black scraper
Fish of East Asia
Fish of Japan
black scraper
Taxa named by Albert Günther